Archibald Leman Cochrane  (12 January 1909 – 18 June 1988) was a Scottish doctor noted for his book Effectiveness and Efficiency: Random Reflections on Health Services. This book advocated the use of randomized control trials to make medicine more effective and efficient.
His advocacy of randomized controlled trials eventually led to the development of the Cochrane Library database of systematic reviews, the establishment of the UK Cochrane Centre in Oxford and the international organisation Cochrane. He is known as one of the fathers of modern clinical epidemiology and evidence-based medicine and is considered to be the originator of the idea of evidence-based medicine in the current era.

Biography

Cochrane was born in Kirklands, Galashiels, Scotland, into a family he described as "industrial upper middle class". His father was killed whilst serving with the King's Own Scottish Borderers during World War I. He won a scholarship to Uppingham School, and obtained another scholarship to King's College, Cambridge, achieving first class honours in Parts I and II of the Natural Sciences Tripos and completing 2nd MB studies in physiology and anatomy in 1930. He qualified in 1938 at University College Hospital, London, at University College London.

Cochrane was born with porphyria. This caused health problems throughout his life. He tried treatment using psychoanalysis under Theodor Reik, following Reik to Berlin, then Vienna and the Hague as the influence of the Nazis increased, combining his treatment with undertaking medical studies in Vienna and Leiden. He became dissatisfied with psychoanalysis. However, he became fluent in German which was useful later on in life. His travels also convinced him of the importance of the anti-fascist cause.

During the Spanish Civil War, Cochrane served as a member of a British Ambulance Unit within the Spanish Medical Aid Committee. In World War II he joined the British Army and was captured during the Battle of Crete and subsequently worked as a Medical Officer at Salonika (Greece) and Hildburghausen, Elsterhorst and Wittenberg an der Elbe (Germany) prisoner of war camps. His experience in the camp led him to believe that much of medicine did not have sufficient evidence to justify its use.

He said, "I knew that there was no real evidence that anything we had to offer had any effect on tuberculosis, and I was afraid that I shortened the lives of some of my friends by unnecessary intervention." As a result, he spent his career urging the medical community to adopt the scientific method.

After the war he studied for a Diploma in Public Health at the London School of Hygiene & Tropical Medicine and spent a year at the Henry Phipps Institute in Philadelphia on a Rockefeller Fellowship. Cochrane joined the Medical Research Council's Pneumoconiosis Unit at Llandough Hospital, a part of Welsh National School of Medicine, now Cardiff University School of Medicine in 1948. Here he began a series of studies on the health of the population of Rhondda Fach — studies which pioneered the use of randomised controlled trials (RCTs).

Cardiff University has released an online video of the Rhondda Fach studies. The video shows some archive footage of the community study. Cochrane describes what he was looking for in the surveys.

In 1956 Cochrane underwent a radical mastectomy to remove what was thought to be cancerous tissue in his right pectoralis minor and axilla.

Academic life

In 1960 he was appointed David Davies Professor of Tuberculosis and Chest Diseases at the Welsh National School of Medicine, now Cardiff University School of Medicine, and nine years later became Director of the new Medical Research Council's Epidemiology Research Unit at 4 Richmond Road, Cardiff. His groundbreaking paper on validation of medical screening procedures, published jointly with fellow epidemiologist Walter W. Holland in 1971, became a classic in the field.

His 1971 Rock Carling Fellowship monograph Effectiveness and Efficiency: Random Reflections on Health Services, first published in 1972 by the Nuffield Provincial Hospitals Trust – now known as the Nuffield Trust, was very influential. To quote from the book's summary :  "An investigation into the workings of the clinical sector of the NHS strongly suggests that the simplest explanation of the findings is that this sector is subject to severe inflation with the output rising much less than would be expected from the input". According to a review in the British Medical Journal, "the hero of the book is the randomized control trial, and the villains are the clinicians in the "care" part of the National Health Service (NHS) who either fail to carry out such trials or succeed in ignoring the results if they do not fit in with their own preconceived ideas".  Maintaining this challenge to the medical care system as he saw it, in 1978, with colleagues, he published a study of 18 developed countries in which he made the following observations: "the indices of health care are not negatively associated with mortality, and there is a marked positive association between the prevalence of doctors and mortality in the younger age groups. No explanation of this doctor anomaly has so far been found. Gross national product per head is the principal variable which shows a consistently strong negative association with mortality." This work was selected for inclusion in a compendium of influential papers, from historically important epidemiologists, published by the Pan American Health Organization (PAHO/WHO) in 1988.

Cochrane promoted the randomised trial and is a co-author with Professor Peter Elwood on a report on the first randomised trial of aspirin in the prevention of vascular disease. He also promoted the cohort study and was a key adviser in a highly detailed cohort study, the Caerphilly Heart Disease Study.

Honours
For his "gallant and distinguished" services in prisoner of war camps he was awarded an MBE by the British Government; for his contributions to epidemiology as a science he was later appointed a CBE.

Autobiography and archive

One Man's Medicine: An Autobiography of Professor Archie Cochrane was published in 1989 and co-authored by Max Blythe. The book was out of print for a number of years but a paperback edition was published by Cardiff University in April 2009 to celebrate the centenary of Cochrane's birth.

The Archie Cochrane Archive is held at the Archie Cochrane Library, Cardiff University.

See also
 Evidence-based medicine

References

Bibliography

External links
 The Cochrane Library
 The Archie Cochrane archive is part of the Archie Cochrane Library at University Hospital Llandough, Cardiff University
 
 
 Effectiveness and efficiency: Random reflections on health services

1909 births
1988 deaths
British epidemiologists
People from Galashiels
People in evidence-based medicine
International Brigades personnel
20th-century Scottish medical doctors
British public health doctors
People educated at Uppingham School
Alumni of King's College, Cambridge
Alumni of the UCL Medical School
Alumni of the London School of Hygiene & Tropical Medicine
Cochrane Collaboration people
Rockefeller Fellows
British Army personnel of World War II
Royal Army Medical Corps officers
British World War II prisoners of war
World War II prisoners of war held by Germany